Khamisu Ahmed Mailantarki is a former Member House of Representatives representing Gombe/Kwami/Funakaye constituencies of Gombe state. He made history in 2011 when he emerged as the only legislator from North-East with the highest Number of vote and was the deputy chairman house committee on FCT area council and member of several other committees such as petroleum upstream, internal security, house services, human right, climate changes and global warming, and solid minerals salt. He is the founder of Mailatantarki Football Care Academy.

Political career 

 Member House of Representatives, Representing Gombe/Kwami/Funakaye 2011-2015
 Gubernatorial aspirant for the 2023 General election under the NNPP

References 

Nigerian politicians
People from Gombe State
Year of birth missing (living people)
Living people